Monaco Forever is a 1984 American film directed by William A. Levey and starring Charles Pitt as an American jewel thief in Monaco.  Michael (Pitt) is trying to set up a robbery of a jewel store, and runs into various characters along the way.

The film runs 48 minutes and is most notable for the first (although brief) appearance of Jean-Claude Van Damme as a character credited as "Gay Karate Man".

References

External links 
 

1984 films
Films set in Monaco
1984 LGBT-related films
1984 comedy films
1980s English-language films